Hygrophorus penarius is a species of fungus belonging to the family Hygrophoraceae.

It is native to Europe, Northern America, and Japan.

References

penarius